Monte Rex Budwig (December 26, 1929 – March 9, 1992) was a West Coast jazz double bassist, professionally known as Monty Budwig.

Early life
Monte Rex Budwig was born in Pender, Nebraska, on December 26, 1929. His parents were musical. He began playing bass during high school, and continued in military bands while he was enlisted in the Air Force for three years.

Later life and career
In 1954, Budwig moved to Los Angeles and performed and recorded under the name Monty Budwig with jazz musicians including Carmen McRae, Barney Kessel, Woody Herman, Red Norvo, and Shelly Manne. Budwig played with pianist Vince Guaraldi in the 1960s, including on the pianist's album Jazz Impressions of Black Orpheus. Budwig was part of Benny Goodman's band for performances in New York, and a tour of Japan in 1964. He also began his career as a studio musician in the 1960s, which encompassed film and television shows, with Steve Allen, Johnny Carson, Merv Griffin and Judy Garland. Budwig taught jazz bassist Scott Colley, then a teenager.

Budwig toured Australia with Goodman in 1973. He made another international tour in 1974, this time to South America with Carmen McRae. His one recording as a leader was Dig, for Concord Records. He died of liver cancer at home in Eagle Rock, Los Angeles, on March 9, 1992. He had a son, Darin, with his first wife. He married his second wife, Arlette McCoy, in 1977. His stepson, Dean McCoy, is a teacher and drummer. Arlette McCoy Budwig, a jazz pianist and teacher, died in 2013.

Discography

As leader
Dig (Dobre Records DR1057, 1978)

As sideman
With Toshiko Akiyoshi
Finesse (Concord, 1978)
With Chet Baker and Bud Shank
Theme Music from "The James Dean Story" (World Pacific, 1956)
With Gary Burton
3 in Jazz (RCA, 1963)
With Herb Alpert
Midnight Sun (A&M 1992)
With Frank Butler
The Stepper (Xanadu, 1977)
Wheelin' and Dealin' (Xanadu, 1978)
With Conte Candoli
Conte Candoli Quartet (Mode, 1957)
Sweet Simon (Best Recordings 1992)
With Betty Carter
'Round Midnight (Atco, 1963)
With June Christy
Do-Re-Mi (Capitol, 1961) – with Bob Cooper
With Rosemary Clooney
Everything's Coming Up Rosie (Concord, 1977)
Rosie Sings Bing (Concord, 1978)
Here's to My Lady (Concord, 1978)
With Bob Cooper (musician)
For All We Know (Fresh Sound 1991)
With Sonny Criss
I'll Catch the Sun! (Prestige, 1969)
With Herb Ellis
Soft & Mellow  (Concord, 1979)
With Bill Evans
Empathy (Verve, 1962) – with Shelly Manne
With Stan Getz
The Dolphin (Concord Jazz, 1981)
Spring Is Here (Concord Jazz, 1981 [1992])
With Vince Guaraldi
Jazz Impressions of Black Orpheus (Fantasy, 1962)
A Boy Named Charlie Brown (Fantasy, 1963)
Jazz Impressions of A Boy Named Charlie Brown (Fantasy, 1964)
From All Sides (Fantasy, 1964) – with Bola Sete
A Charlie Brown Christmas (Fantasy, 1965)
It's the Great Pumpkin, Charlie Brown: Music from the Soundtrack (Craft Recordings, 2018)
With Richie Kamuca & Bill Holman
 Jazz Erotica (West Coast Jazz in Hifi) (Fantasy 1959)
With Stan Kenton
Stan Kenton Plays for Today (Capitol, 1966)
The World We Know (Capitol, 1967)
With Barney Kessel
Kessel Plays Standards (Contemporary, 1954)
Some Like It Hot (Contemporary, 1959)
With Jimmy Knepper
Jimmy Knepper in L.A. (Discomate, 1977)
With Stan Levey
Stan Levey Quintet (Vap 1957)
With Julie London
All Through the Night: Julie London Sings the Choicest of Cole Porter (Liberty, 1965)
With Junior Mance
Straight Ahead! (Capitol, 1964)
With Shelly Manne
Concerto for Clarinet & Combo (Contemporary, 1957)
The Gambit (Contemporary, 1958)
Shelly Manne & His Men Play Peter Gunn (Contemporary, 1959)
Son of Gunn!! (Contemporary, 1959)
At the Black Hawk 1 (Contemporary, 1959)
At the Black Hawk 2 (Contemporary, 1959)
At the Black Hawk 3 (Contemporary, 1959)
At the Black Hawk 4 (Contemporary, 1959)
At the Black Hawk 5 (Contemporary, 1959 [1991])
My Son the Jazz Drummer! (Contemporary, 1962)
My Fair Lady with the Un-original Cast (Capitol, 1964)
Manne–That's Gershwin! (Capitol, 1965)
Boss Sounds! (Atlantic, 1966)
Jazz Gunn (Atlantic, 1967)
Perk Up (Concord Jazz, 1967 [1976])
With Charles McPherson
Free Bop! (Xanadu, 1978)
With Lennie Niehaus
 The Octet # 2 Vol. 3 (Contemporary 1991)
With Joe Pass
Live at Yoshi's (Pablo, 1992)
Nuages (Live at Yoshi's, vol. 2) (Pablo, 1997)
With Art Pepper
Surf Ride (Savoy, 1952-1954 [1956])
With Spike Robinson
Reminiscin (Dedicated to Monty Budwig) (Capri 1992)
With Spike Robinson and Harry "Sweets" Edison
Jusa Bit 'O' Blues (Capri 1989)
Jusa Bit 'O' Blues Vol. 2 (Capri 1990)
With Shorty Rogers
Portrait of Shorty (RCA Victor, 1957)
With Bola Sete
The Incomparable Bola Sete (Fantasy, 1964)
With Bud Shank
 California Concert (Contemporary, 1985) with Shorty Rogers
With Zoot Sims
Hawthorne Nights (Pablo, 1977)
On The Korner (Pablo 1994)
With Ira Sullivan 
 Multimedia (Galaxy Music, 1978 [1982])
With Supersax
Supersax & L.A. Voices - The Complete Edition (CBS 1990)
With Cal Tjader
Breathe Easy (Galaxy, 1977)
With Sarah Vaughan
Sarah Vaughan with the Jimmy Rowles Quintet (Mainstream, 1974)

References

1926 births
1992 deaths
Cool jazz double-bassists
American jazz double-bassists
Male double-bassists
West Coast jazz double-bassists
People from Pender, Nebraska
20th-century American musicians
Jazz musicians from Nebraska
20th-century double-bassists
20th-century American male musicians
American male jazz musicians